Oxalis gigantea  is an Oxalis species found in Regions Antofagasta, Atacama and Coquimbo of Chile. It was first described in 1845. Oxalis gigantea is a shrub pollinated by hummingbirds.

References

External links

gigantea

Flora of Chile